Parutholli Chalappurathu Kuttikrishnan, popularly known by his pen name Uroob (1915 – 1979) was an Indian writer of Malayalam literature. Along with Basheer, Thakazhi, Kesavadev, and Pottekkatt, Uroob was counted among the progressive writers in Malayalam during the twentieth century. He was known for his novels such as Sundarikalum Sundaranmarum and Ummachu, short stories like Rachiyamma and the screenplays of a number of Malayalam films including Neelakuyil, the first Malayalam feature film to receive the National Film Award. He was a recipient of several honours including Kendra Sahithya Academy Award and the inaugural Kerala Sahitya Akademi Award for Novel.

Biography 
P. C. Kuttikrishnan was born on June 8, 1915, to Karunakara Menon and Parukutty Amma at Pallapram, a small village near Ponnani, in Malappuram district of the south Indian state of Kerala. His early education was at A. V. High School, Ponnani and after matriculation, he travelled for six years, working at various places in India. During this period, he worked at a tea estate in the Nilgiri hills, a textile factory and K. R. Brothers Printers in Kozhikode, Mangalodhayam monthly, and joined the Kozhikode station of the All India Radio (AIR) in 1954. After retiring from service as a producer of AIR in 1975, he served as the editor of Kunkumam weekly for a while before joining Malayala Manorama in 1976 where he worked as the chief editor of Malayala Manorama weekly and Bhashaposhini. He also served as the president of the Kerala Sahitya Akademi.

Kuttikrishnan married Devaki Amma, the sister-in-law of Edasseri Govindan Nair, in 1948. He died on July 10, 1979, at the age of 64, while he was being treated at the Government Medical College, Kottayam.

Literary and film career 
Kuttikrishnan joined a literary group in Ponnani in the 1930s which had Edasseri Govindan Nair, Kuttikrishna Marar, Akkitham, Kadavanad Kuttikrishnan, and Moothedath Narayanan Vaidyar as its members and it was during this time he wrote his first short story, Velakkariyude Checkkan. He assumed the pen name, Uroob which means eternal youth in Persian language and dusk in Arabic, for an article he wrote on K. Raghavan, a noted music director of Malayalam cinema, to conceal his identity as the music director was his colleague at AIR and he continued with the pseudonym thereafter. His first short story anthology, Neerchalukal was published in 1945 and three years later, Amina, his first novel was published. His body of work included 8 novels, 27 short story anthologies, three plays, 3 poetry anthologies and three essay compilations. Ummachu published in 1954, Mindappennu, published in 1956 and Sundarikalum Sundaranmarum (The Beautiful and the Handsome) published in 1958 among novels and Gopalan Nayarude Thadi, Rachiyamma and Thurannitta Jalakam among short stories are some of his most notable works. M. Krishnan Nair, a known Malayalam literary critic, counted Rachiyamma among the best stories of world literature. Ummachu has been translated into English under the title, The Beloved. Several of his works have strong female characters and he was known to be an advocate of gender equality. Three of his anthologies, Ankaveeran, Mallanum Maranavum and Appuvinte Lokam are children's literature and he is considered by many as one of the greats of that genre in Malayalam literature.

In 1954, When Ramu Kariat decided to make a feature film based on Uroob's story, Neelakuyil, under the same name, he co-wrote the screenplay with P. Bhaskaran. The film went on become a landmark in Malayalam cinema and was the first feature film to receive national recognition by winning the National Film Award for Best Feature Film in Malayalam. His association with P. Bhaskaran continued to yield four more films, Rarichan Enna Pauran (1956), Nairu Pidicha Pulivalu (1958), Kurukshetram (1970) and Ummachu (1971). In between, he wrote the screenplay for Mindapennu, a film by K. S. Sethumadhavan in 1970. He wrote the screenplays for two more films, Thrisandhya in 1972 and Aniyara in 1978, the latter a film by Bharathan.

Awards and honours 
Uroob received three awards from the Government of Tamil Nadu (then Government of Madras), for Kathir Katta in 1948, Thurannitta Jalakam in 1949 and Kumbedukkunna Mannu in 1951. Kerala Sahitya Akademi instituted an annual award for Novel in 1958, Ummachu was selected for inaugural award. He received Sahitya Akademi Award in 1960 for his work, Sundarikalum Sundaranmarum, in 1960, the same year as he received the M. P. Paul Award for Gopalan Nayarude Thady. In 1971, he received the Kerala State Film Award for Best Story for the film adaptation of Ummachu. Two years later, Sundarikalum Sundaranmarum won him another honour, the Ashan Centenary Award. The Government of Kerala set up a museum, Uroob Memorial Literary Museum, in his honour at the premises of Kiliyanad School in Kozhikode.

Major works

Novels

Short stories 

 
 
 
 
 
 
 
 
 
 
 
 
 
 
 
 
 
 
 
 
 
 
 
 
 
 
 
 
Kathir-Katta
Lathiyum Pookalum

Plays (theatre)

Essay compilations 
 
 
Uroobinde Lekhanangal

Children's stories

Translations in other languages

Poems 
 
 Nizhalattam
 Maamoolinte Mattoli

Screenplays 

Neelakuyil
Rarichan Enna Pouran
Nairu Pidicha Pulivalu
Kurukshetram
Ummachu
Thrisandhya
Aniyara

Short film 
Rachiyamma

Works on Uroob

References

Further reading

External links 
 
 
 

Novelists from Kerala
Malayalam-language writers
Malayalam novelists
People from Malappuram district
Kerala State Film Award winners
Recipients of the Sahitya Akademi Award in Malayalam
1915 births
1979 deaths
20th-century Indian novelists
Poets from Kerala
Dramatists and playwrights from Kerala